Prudencio Baldivia (September 2, 1928 – October 10, 1997), better known as Dencio Padilla or Tata Dens, was a veteran Filipino actor and comedian.

Career
He appeared in films as the favorite sidekick of Fernando Poe Jr. Known for his Batangueño accent when speaking, Padilla also played supporting roles for other Filipino stars, like Ace Vergel, Rudy Fernandez, Phillip Salvador, Vilma Santos, Nora Aunor, Sharon Cuneta, Maricel Soriano and other big stars.

Personal life
He was married to Catalina Dominguez from Mabalacat, Pampanga, a housewife and they had 8 kids; Dennis, Samuel, Glenn, Jennifer, Gene, Richard, Ched, and Rot. They lived their entire life in P.Jacinto Street corner, Biglang Awa and EDSA, Caloocan city. Dennis is also an actor as well as a politician; Samuel is an OFW Seaman; Glenn is OFW in Middle East places such as Kuwait, Jeddah, Riyadh, Dubai, and is presently in the USA; Jennifer is OFW in Dubai; Gene Padilla also a comedian and actor; Richard died in 1999; Ched is OFW in Singapore; and youngest Rot is in Baldivia. The 5 boys were products of Notre Dame of Manila, and the 3 girls of Our Lady of Grace Academy, both in Caloocan city, a walking distance from their home. All 8 attended college in UST/San Sebastián/Centro Escolar/UE. All 8 appeared in movies and commercials during their childhood.

Health and death
Padilla was rushed to the hospital on September 30, 1997 after complaining of chest pains. About to be checked out from the hospital, Padilla died of cardiac arrest on October 10, 1997 at Quezon City, Philippines. Apart from his son Dennis Padilla who followed his footsteps to become a comedian, Dencio Padilla has other children. He was buried at Nagcarlan Municipal Cemetery in Nagcarlan, Laguna

Filmography

Movies

Lo' Waist Gang at si Og sa Mindoro (1958)
Laban sa Lahat (1958)
Sumpa at Pangako (1959)
Ang Kanyang Kamahalan (1959)
Tough Guy (1959) Dencio
Gabi ng Lagim (1960) (segment 2)
Cuatro Cantos (1960)
Hong Kong Honeymoon (1960)
Mga Tigreng Taga-Bukid (1962)
Batang Maynila (1962)
Dead or Alive (1962)
Cuatro Condenados (1962)
Sigaw ng Digmaan (1963)
Kung Gabi sa Maynila (1963)
Ito Ang Maynila (1963)
Ang Asawa Kong Barat (1963)
Isputnik vs. Darna (1963)
Sierra Madre (1963)
Baril na Ginto (1964)
Swanie (1965)
Dandansoy (1965)
Ang Daigdig Ko'y Ikaw (1965)
Guillermo Bravado (1965)
Zamboanga (1966)
Ang Iniluluha Ko'y Dugo (1966)
Alyas Phantom (1966)
Itinakwil Man Kita (1966)
Si Siyanang at Ang 7 Tsikiting (1966)
Dedicate To You (1966)
Mga Alabok sa Lupa (1967)
Ex-Convict (1967)
Like Father, Like Son: Kung Ano Ang Puno Siya Ang Bunga! (1967)
Langit at Lupa (1967)
Durango (1967)
Alamat ng 7 Kilabot (1967)
To Susan With Love (1968)
Tatlong Hari (1968)
Tanging Ikaw (1968)
Sorrento (1968)
Magpakailanman (1968)
Dos Por Dos (1968)
Zato Duling: The Cross-Eyed Swordsman (1969)
Our Man Duling (1969)
Nardong Kutsero (1969)
Ikaw Ang Lahat Sa Akin (1969)
Gun-Runners (1969)
Batang Matadero (1969)
Tora! Tora! Toray! (1971)Liezl At Ang 7 Hoods (1971)Family Planting (1971)Apat na Patak ng Dugo ni Adan (1971)Ang Kampana sa Santa Quiteria (1971)Salaginto't Salagubang (1972)Bilangguang Puso (1972)Karnabal (1973) BadongHanggang Sa Kabila ng Daigdig: The Tony Maiquez Story (1973)Ang Agila At Ang Araw (1973)Aking Maria Clara (1973)Dragonfire (1974)Batya't Palu-Palo (1974) Takio
Kaming Matatapang Ang Apog (1975)
Hit and Run (1975)
Anino ng Araw (1975)
Anak ng Araw (1975)
Ang Leon at Ang Daga (1975) Dencio
Sapagka't Kami'y Mga Misis Lamang (1976)
Bato sa Buhangin (1976) Lucio
Tutubing Kalabaw Tutubing Karayom (1977)
Nagbabagang Asero (1977)
Bontoc (1977)
Little Christmas Tree (1977)
Tatak ng Tundo (1978) Damian
Isang Araw Isang Buhay (1978)
The Jess Lapid Story (1978)
Salonga (1978)
Mahal...Ginagabi Ka Na Naman (1979)
Holdup: Special Squad, D.B. (1979)
Dakpin... Killers For Hire (1979)
Anak ng Atsay (1979)
Isa Para Sa Lahat, Lahat para Sa Isa (1979)Dobol Dribol (1979)Mahal, Saan Ka Nanggaling Kagabi? (1979)Tatak Angustia (1980) GudoyKalibre .45 (1980)
Ang Leon At Ang Kuting (1980)
Angelita, Ako Ang Iyong Ina (1980) Dennis
Ang Agila At Ang Falcon (1980)
Tartan (1981)
Rocky Tu-log (1981)
Iskorokotoy (1981)
Palpak Connection (1981)
Kamandag ng Rehas ng Bakal (1981)
Boogie (1981) Boogie
Juan Balutan (1982)
Cross My Heart (1982) Dexter
Bad Boys From Dadiangas (1982)
Annie Sabungera (1982)
D'Wild Wild Weng (1982) Mr. Dencio
Forgive and Forget (1983)
The Cute The Sexy n' The Tiny (1982)
Inside Job (1983)
Aking Prince Charming (1983)
Idol (1984)
Somewhere (1984) Tengteng
Naku Ha! (1984)
Anak ni Waray vs. Anak ni Biday (1984)
Julian Vaquero (1984)
Bagets 2 (1984) Erpat
Tinik sa Dibdib (1985)
Nagalit Ang Patay Sa Haba ng Lamay (1985)
Blue Jeans Gang (1985)
Anak ng Tondo (1985) Tata Teban
Public Enemy No. 2: Maraming Number Two (1985) CarlosTatak ng Yakuza (1986)Kamagong (1986)Inday-Inday Sa Balitaw (1986) SimoCaptain Barbell (1986) Police ChiefBatang Quiapo (1986) Momoy "Lugaw" DavidVigilante (1987)No Retreat, No Surrender, Si Kumander (1987)Kapag Puno Na Ang Salop (1987) Sgt. SibalKapag Lumaban Ang Api (1987) NardoBoy Tornado (1987) InggoHumanda Ka ... Ikaw Ang Susunod (1987)Stupid Cupid (1988) Tomas (segment "Hahabul-Habol")Langit at Lupa (1988)Jockey T'yan (1988)Leon at Tigre (1989)Tatak ng Isang Api (1989)Bote, Dyaryo, Garapa (1989)Ako ang Huhusga (1989) Sgt. SibalEverlasting Love (1989)Ipaglalaban Ko (1989)Galit Sa Mundo (1989)Joe Pring: Homicide Manila Police (1989)Hulihin Si, Nardong Toothpick (1990) Mr. LunaDino Dinero (1990)Dadaan Ka Sa Ibabaw Ng Aking Bangkay (1990)Kahit Konting Pagtingin (1990)Biokids (1990)Ikasa Mo, Ipuputok Ko (1990)Kristobal: Tinik Sa Korona (1990)Bikining Itim (1990)Samson En Goliath (1990)Wooly Booly 2: Ang Titser Kong Alien (1990)Lover's Delight (1990) Mr. PadillaMay Isang Tsuper Ng Taxi (1990)Para Sa Iyo Ang Huling Bala Ko (1990)Pitong Gamol (1991)Mabuting Kaibigan, Masamang Kaaway (1991) GorioAng Utol Kong Hoodlum (1991)Pempe ni Sara at Pen (1992) The Man in WhiteMiss Na Miss Kita: Ang Utol Kong Hoodlum II (1992)Basagulero (1992)Lucio Margallo (1992) Tata TeryongDito sa Pitong Gatang (1992)Ali in Wonderland (1992)Padre Amante Guerrero (1993) CrispinHulihin: Probinsyanong Mandurukot (1993) DelAstig (1993)Ang Boyfriend Kong Gamol (1993)Ikaw Lang (1993) Ka ErningMasahol Pa sa Hayop (1993) BaloyJesus Calderon: Maton (1993)Nandito Ako (1993) Tata IskoWalang Matigas Na Tinapay Sa Mainit Na Kape (1994)Tony Bagyo: Daig Pa Ang Asong Ulol (1994)Sobra Talaga ... Over! (1994)Tunay na Magkaibigan Walang Iwanan Peksman! (1994) Tata EmilioCuadro De Jack (1994)Chickboys (1994)Baby Paterno: Dugong Pulis (1994)Abrakadabra (1994) BasteIsmael Zacarias (1994) BugalooKanto Boy 2: Anak ni Totoy Guapo (1995) ManingUrban Rangers (1995) EgayMinsan Pa: Kahit Konting Pagtingin Part 2 (1995) BasilioIkaw Pa ... Eh Love Kita! (1995) Karina's UnclePulis Probinsiya 2: Tapusin Natin ang Laban (1995) Father SanchezDog Tag: Katarungan Sa Aking Kamay (1995) Mang MartinSPO1 Don Juan: Da Dancing Policeman (1996) Lolo TasyoPusong Hiram (1996)Makamandag Na Dugo (1996)Maginoong Barumbado (1996)Ikaw Ang Mahal Ko (1996) TebanAng Syota Kong Balikbayan (1996)Totoy Mola (1997) Tatay PasyoPablik Enemi 1 n 2: Aksidental Heroes (1997)Laban Ko Ito: Walang Dapat Madamay (1997) SimonKriselda: Sabik sa Iyo (1997)Go Johnny Go (1997)Enteng en Mokong: Kaming Mga Mababaw Ang Kaligayahan (1997)Ang Maton at ang Showgirl (1998)

TelevisionEat Bulaga (1983) RpnTonite With Boots and Dencio (1984-1988)RpnIsang Mundo Isang Lahi (1988) as Amado SalazarGMA Supershow (1991) GuestAno Ba Siya? The Trip Show (1992-1995)TNT: Talak ng Taon (1995) as Main HostASAP (1996) as Singer PerformerAfternoon Overload Saya (1997) Last TV Appearance before his death.

Awards
1964: Nominated - Best Supporting Actor, Ito ang Maynila - FAMAS 1963
1984: Nominated - Best Supporting Actor, Tatak ng Yakuza - FAMAS 1984
1991: Won - Best Supporting Actor, Kahit Konting Pagtingin'' - FAP 1991

References

1928 births
1997 deaths
20th-century comedians
20th-century Filipino male actors
Filipino male comedians
Filipino male film actors
Male actors from Metro Manila
People from Manila
People from Quezon City